The London Brighton and South Coast Railway operated a number of cross channel ferry services, between its ports of Shoreham, Newhaven and Littlehampton to Dieppe, Honfleur, and Jersey. The profitable Newhaven-Dieppe service was operated in conjunction with the French Western Railway (Chemins de Fer de l'Ouest).

After 1880 the railway became a partner with the London and South Western Railway to form the South Western and Brighton Railway Companies Steam Packet Service (SW&BRCSPS) which bought out the existing operators between Portsmouth and the Isle of Wight.

In 1884 the Isle of Wight Marine Transit Company started a rail freight ferry link between the Hayling Island Branch Line at Langstone and the Bembridge branch line at St Helens quay. To provide the link the rail ferry Carrier, designed to carry railway trucks, was moved from Scotland. The project was unsuccessful and despite being acquired in full by the LB&SCR in 1886 ended in 1888

Ships
Ships operated by the LB&SCR and (after 1863) Chemin de Fer de l'Ouest were:

The company also operated a number of ships on the Isle of Wight Portsmouth to Ryde service jointly with the London and South Western Railway.

References

Sources

Lists of ships of the United Kingdom
 
London, Brighton and South Coast Railway
Steamships of the United Kingdom
Merchant ships of the United Kingdom